The Fantasy class is a cruise ship class operated by Carnival Cruise Lines. The first vessel of the class, Carnival Fantasy, entered service in 1990. All eight vessels of the class were constructed by Kvaerner Masa-Yards, in Helsinki, Finland, at the Hietalahti shipyard.

Design
This class utilizes a "modern ocean/cruise liner" design, with most of its cabins situated within the hull and only a handful of suites on the superstructure, similar to the s built in the late 1980s. The Fantasy class is the only class currently in service for Carnival initially built with only a few balcony cabins.  Carnival Elation and Carnival Paradise differ from the other ships of the class in that they are equipped with Azipod azimuth thrusters for propulsion. They were also the last cruise ships built with the lifeboats only on the upper deck.

"Evolutions Of Fun" refit 
In late 2006, Carnival Cruise Lines announced their intention to refurbish the Fantasy-class fleet under the program name "Evolutions Of Fun". This was completed in 2010 and cost $250 million.

Ships

References

External links
 Carnival Cruise Line

Cruise ship classes
Carnival Cruise Lines
Ships built in Finland